Oskar-Heinrich Bär (25 May 1913 – 28 April 1957) was a German Luftwaffe flying ace who served throughout World War II in Europe. Bär flew more than one thousand combat missions, and fought in the Western, Eastern and Mediterranean theatres. On 18 occasions he survived being shot down, and according to records in the German Federal Archives, he claimed to have shot down 228 enemy aircraft and was credited with 208 aerial victories, 16 of which were in a Messerschmitt Me 262 jet fighter. Sources credit him with 220 – 96 on Eastern Theatre and 124 on Western Theatre – up to 222 aerial victories may also be possible.

List of aerial victories claimed
According to US historian David T. Zabecki, Bär was credited with 221 aerial victories. Obermaier also lists him with 221 aerial victories. The highest figure is given by Aders and Held who list Bär with 222 aerial victory claims. According to Spick, as well as by Morgan and Weal, Bär was credited with 220 aerial victories. Mathews and Foreman, authors of Luftwaffe Aces – Biographies and Victory Claims, researched the German Federal Archives and found records for 208 aerial victory claims, plus 20 further unconfirmed claims. This figure includes 95 aerial victories on the Eastern Front and 113 on the Western Front, including 14 four-engined bombers and 15 victories with the Me 262 jet fighter.

Victory claims were logged to a map-reference (PQ = Planquadrat), for example "PQ 05 Ost S/FN". These sectors were then subdivided into 36 smaller units to give a location area 3 × 4 km in size.

Notes

References

Citations

Bibliography

 
 
 
 
 
 
 
 
 
 
 
 
 
 
 
 
 
 
 
 
 

Aerial victories of Bar, Oskar-Heinrich
Bar, Oskar-Heinrich
Aviation in World War II